The Jahnstadion was a 12,500 capacity stadium in Regensburg, Germany. Until 2015 it was primarily used for football and was the home of SSV Jahn Regensburg. Built in 1926, it also hosted five football matches during the 1972 Summer Olympics. In 2017, it was mostly demolished and replaced by apartments and a school.

References

External links 
1972 Summer Olympics official report. Volume 1. Part 1. p. 121.
1972 Summer Olympics official report. Volume 3. p. 359.

Football venues in Germany
Venues of the 1972 Summer Olympics
Olympic football venues
SSV Jahn Regensburg
Sport in Regensburg
Buildings and structures in Regensburg
Sports venues in Bavaria
1926 establishments in Germany
Sports venues completed in 1926